On the 5 and 6 July 1809, north of Vienna, took place one of the most important confrontations in human history until then, the Battle of Wagram. It opposed an Austrian army led by generalissimus Archduke Charles, Duke of Teschen to a Franco-Italo-German army under the command of Napoleon I, Emperor of the French, King of Italy, Protector of the Confederation of the Rhine.

Below are presented the military units which participated at this battle. On this page are listed only the troops who were close enough to the hostilities to be able to intervene. The Austrian V Corps, left behind as a strategic reserve, and the "Army of Inner Austria", whose elements from the vanguard arrived close to the battlefield only in the afternoon of the 6th, too late to intervene, have been omitted from the article. Similarly, the French VIII Corps left outside the theater of hostilities; the Franco-Allied garrison and the batteries on the island of Lobau; the squadrons and the French regiments left on the right bank of the Danube to protect the lines of communication, and most part of the Center Corps belonging to the Franco-Italian army, located in Pressburg, have also been omitted from this article because they played no part in the battle.

The Austrian army was not reinforced during the second day. Archduke Charles commanded about 140,000-150,000 men, including 15,000 cavalrymen and over 400 artillery pieces.

During the first day of the fighting, Napoleon's army numbered about 155,000-160,000 men and around the noon of the second day it was reinforced up to 165,000-180,000 men, out of whom 27,000 were cavalrymen, and more than 400 cannons. This figure remains approximate, as it does not take into consideration the losses suffered during the first day of the battle, which are difficult to estimate. The losses of the army are only a global estimation, including the hostilities on both the 5th and the 6th of July. In addition, on the 6th, Napoleon basically could not rely on the Saxon infantry from the Saxon IX Corps, which was completely disorganised and unfit for combat following the hard fighting during the first day. The French and Allied forces included two armies: the "Grand Army of Germany", which had taken part in the previous campaign in Southern Germany and Austria (the main theater of the War of the Fifth Coalition), and the "Army of Italy", of smaller dimensions, which arrived on the battlefield in stages and only with a part of its effectives, during the two days. The order of battle of the French Army was profoundly reorganised during June, and it was modified even during the battle, with some units being attached to different commanders, according to circumstances.

Abbreviations of military ranks and dignities 

Comments
* Maréchal d'Empire, or Marshal, was not a "rank" within the French army, but a personal title granted to distinguished generals of division, along with higher pay and privileges. The highest "rank" in Napoleon's army was actually Général de Division.

Opposing armies

Kaiserlich-königliche Armee 
The Austrian army, called Kaiserlich-königliche Armee (Imperial-Royal Army), was composed of multinational troops from across the Empire, including proper Austrians, Bohemians, Moravians, Hungarians, Romanians, Croatians, Poles and other ethnic groups, with regiments speaking various languages. Another facet that showed the diverse nature of this army was that Landwehr (Militias) units, some of which were quite poorly trained, were brigaded together with regular troops.

Following the Battle of Aspern-Essling, Charles massed whatever forces he could spare, recalling two-thirds of III Korps from Linz, but, with war raging on secondary theatres, he was unable or unwilling to recall any additional forces. Archduke Charles did plan for the small "Army of Inner Austria" under Archduke John of Austria to march out from Pressburg, some 40 kilometers away, and participate in the battle, reckoning that the timely arrival of this force would reinforce his weak left. Excluding the "Army of Inner Austria", the forces that Charles had available for the two days of battle were about 138,000 men, with 414 artillery pieces.

Archduke Charles, aged 37 at the time of the battle, had under his direct command the Kaiserlich-königliche Hauptarmee, the main Austrian army. He was seconded by 39-year-old Maximilian von Wimpffen, the army's Quartermaster General (Chief of Staff), a pugnacious and assertive character, who was well respected in the Austrian army for his knowledge of military strategy. The Austrian army was divided into several Korps, as follows:
 Advance Guard: 14,000 men, 48 guns, under the command of 49-year-old  Feldmarschall-Leutnant Armand von Nordmann, a French émigré and a competent general;
 I Korps: 23,000 men, 68 guns, under the command of 53-year-old  General der Kavallerie Heinrich von Bellegarde, who had served under Archduke Charles several times in the past and was a sound, albeit unenterprising commander;
 II Korps: 27,000 men, 68 guns, under the command of 52-year-old Feldmarschalleutnant Friedrich Franz Xaver of Hohenzollern-Hechingen, a Rhineland Prince and a commander with an impeccable reputation;
 III Korps: 18,000 men, 58 guns under 61-year-old Feldzeugmeister Johann Karl von Kollowrat-Krakowsky, a Bohemian noble with a long-standing military record;
 IV Korps: 19,000 men, 60 guns, under the command of 47-year-old Feldmarschalleutnant Franz Seraph of Rosenberg-Orsini, a descendant of a great German noble family of Italian descent, who had fought against the French during the French Revolutionary Wars and in 1805;
 VI Korps: 18,000 men, 64 guns, under the command of 51-year-old Feldmarschalleutnant Johann von Klenau, another Bohemian noble and a general who had won quite a remarkable reputation during the French Revolutionary Wars;
 I Reserve Korps: 18,000 men, 48 guns, under the command of 49-year-old General der Kavallerie Johann I Joseph, Prince of Liechtenstein, an Austrian Prince, competent commander and a personal friend of Archduke Charles.

Although in the vicinity of the battlefield, the V Korps (12,000 men, 50 guns) under Feldmarschalleutnant Prince Heinrich XV Reuss of Plauen had been left behind on the Bisamberg heights as a strategic reserve, a position which meant that it was too far away to take part to any fighting on or around the Marchfeld, and were thus not a part of Charles' effective fighting force. This was due to Charles's desire to protect his communication lines towards Bohemia and Moravia.

Grande Armée 
As opposed to his Austrian counterpart, Napoleon managed to muster two secondary armies for the upcoming battle. The first, called the Army of Italy, had marched from northern Italy to the main theatre of operations north of Vienna and was led by Napoleon's stepson, the Viceroy of Italy, Prince Eugène de Beauharnais. The second was the XI Corps, which formed the Army of Dalmatia, under General of Division Auguste de Marmont. However, the Army of Dalmatia, as well as a part of the Army of Italy only arrived on the battlefield towards midday on 6 July, at about the same time as an additional force, a Bavarian division under general Karl Philipp von Wrede.

All these forces considered, Napoleon could muster an army of around 166,000 men, with 433 guns. He was seconded by Major Général (Chief of Staff), 56-year-old Maréchal d'Empire Louis-Alexandre Berthier, a seasoned officer, who had been serving as Napoleon's Chief of Staff since 1796. The army was organised in the usual French Corps system and the main army, Armée d'Allemagne ("Army of Germany") was divided as follows:

 The Imperial Guard: 10,500 men, 60 guns, under the direct command of Napoleon;
 II Corps: 27,000 men, 64 guns, under the command of 42-year-old Général de division Nicolas-Charles Oudinot, a fearless commander, who had a reputation for leading from the front;
 III Corps: 38,000 men, 120 guns, under the command of 39-year-old Maréchal d'Empire Louis-Nicolas Davout, a stern disciplinarian and one of the best commanders in the French army;
 IV Corps: 28,000 men, 86 guns, under the command of 51-year-old Maréchal d'Empire André Masséna, a general who had fought against the Austrians many times in the past and who had a reputation for exceptional military talent and cunning;
 VII Corps: only one Bavarian division (6,600 men, 24 guns) was present, under 42-year-old General von Wrede;
 IX Corps: 17,000 Saxons, 38 guns, under 46-year-old Maréchal d'Empire Jean-Baptiste Bernadotte, a commander who had acquired some fame during the Wars of the Revolution, but who often had strained relations with Napoleon;
 XI Corps ("Army of Dalmatia"): 10,000 men, 28 guns, under 34-year-old Général de division Auguste de Marmont, an up-and-coming commander and personal friend of the Emperor;
 The Reserve Cavalry Corps (three heavy cavalry divisions): 8,000 men, 24 guns, under the command of 40-year-old Maréchal d'Empire Jean-Baptiste Bessières, a skilled cavalry commander and loyal supporter of the Emperor.

The "Army of Italy", under the command of 27-year-old Prince Eugène, the Viceroy of Italy and Napoleon's stepson. Eugène's army had a total of 44 guns and was made up of:
 the small Italian Royal Guard (1,700 men) under 33-year-old Général de division Achille Fontanelli;
 V Corps: 7,000 men, under 43-year-old Général de division Jacques MacDonald, who had acquired considerable fame as a general of the Revolution but who had subsequently fallen out with Napoleon and was only just coming back into grace;
 VI Corps: 12,000 men, under 41-year-old Général de division Paul Grenier, a seasoned commander.

Napoleon also massed additional artillery on the island of Lobau – 28 18-pounders, 24 12-pounders, 17 28-centimetre heavy mortars, 10 howitzers and a number of small calibre guns (4 and 6-pounders). Also stationed on the island of Lobau during the battle were one regiment and 5 battalions defending the crucial communications with Vienna. These troops would not see action at Wagram, although the batteries would open an artillery barrage when Austrians from Klenau's VI Corps came within range, on the second day of the battle. All the forces that remained on this island were placed under the command of general Aubry, later under the command of general Jean-Louis Reynier.

Finally, the VIII Corps, under General of Division Dominique Vandamme was left out of the battle and was left behind to cover Vienna and the southern bank of the Danube upstream from the Austrian capital.

Franco-Allied Forces 
Commander: Emperor Napoleon I

Grand Army of Germany 

Commander: Emperor Napoleon I

Army Staff 

Chief of Staff: MdE Berthier
Vice Chief of Staff: GD Dumas
Deputy to the Vice Chief of Staff: GB Bailly de Monthion
Artillery commander: GD Lariboisière
Deputy artillery commander: GD Foucher
Chief of military engineers: GD Bertrand
Deputy chief of military engineers: Col Blein

French Imperial Guard 

Comments
* Some authors (Naulet, Hourtoulle) cite GD Walther as being the commander of the entire Guard. General Walther had indeed commanded the Guard during the marches of this campaign. Rothenberg considers that Emperor Napoleon was the direct commander of the Guard, because he kept this unit under very strict control and it acted only at his command. Furthermore, Walther, although one of the most experienced generals on the battlefield, had previously commanded only cavalry. Thanks to his prestige among the ranks of this unit and the fact that he often commanded the Guard cavalry, MdE Bessières was naturally considered to have the authority to command this unit, although in this battle he was granted only the command of the Cavalry Reserve.

** GB Curial had been promoted to the rank of GD after the battle of Aspern-Essling and had been granted the command of the 1st Young Guard Division, but he nominally kept the command of the 1st Foot Chasseurs Regiment from the Old Guard as their deputy major general. The major general of the Foot Chasseurs (honorary appointment), MdE Soult, was in Spain.

*** Pigeard (La Garde Imperiale) cites GD Walther as being the direct commander of the Horse Grenadiers. It is certain that this general spent much of the 6th of July by directly commanding this unit, as it was his favourite one.

II Corps (Oudinot) 

Comments
* GD Oudinot replaced MdE Lannes, mortally wounded at the battle of Aspern-Essling, at the head of the II Corps.
** The 1st and 2nd divisions of this Corps were formed only from the 4th battalion of several regiments, some present at Wagram in the composition of other Corps, others being in Spain with their other 3 battalions and their colonel. The 4th battalion of these regiments was usually made up from young recruits without experience, divided, according to the new French system, in 4 "center" companies. To fill up the ranks, according to the regulations, 2 more "élite" companies were added (one of grenadiers and one of voltigeurs for the line regiments, and one of foot carabiniers and one of voltigeurs for the light regiments), generally consisting of veterans.
*** After the battle of Aspern-Essling GD Frère replaced GD Claparède at the head of the 2nd Division.
**** After the battle of Aspern-Essling GD Grandjean replaced GD Saint-Hilaire, mortally wounded on the 22nd of May, at the head of the 3rd Division.

III Corps (Davout)

IV Corps (Masséna)

VII Corps (von Wrede's Bavarian division)

IX Corps (Bernadotte)

XI Corps or the Army of Dalmatia (Marmont)

Cavalry Reserve (Bessières)

Army of Italy (Eugène) 

Under the overall command of Emperor Napoleon I, king of Italy

Commander: Prince Eugène
First Adjutant: GB Charles Nicolas d'Anthouard de Vraincourt

Austrian army 

Commander: Archduke Charles, Duke of Teschen
Chief of Staff: GM Maximilian von Wimpffen

Vanguard (von Nordmann)

I Corps (von Bellegarde)

II Corps (von Hohenzollern) 

Comments
* Some sources state FML Ulm's division was commanded by FML von Siegenthal.

III Corps (Kollowrat) 

Comments
* Some sources state GM Schneller's brigade was commanded by Ob Schmuttermayer.

IV Corps (von Rosenberg)

VI Corps (Klenau)   
Strength: 13 742 		

1 st Division FML Vincent -  Strength 3 750 
		
1. Brigade	GM Wallmoden 			
Grenzer Regiment B (1/2 Bat.) 				
Husaren-Regiment 7   Liechtenstein (8 Esc.) 				
2. Brigade 	GM Mariassy 			
Bat. 1 Volunt. Vienna			
Bat. 2 Volunt. Vienna			
Bat. Landwehr Colloredo 				
3. Brigade 	GM Vecsey † 			
Bat. Grenzer Saint-Georg 				
Husaren - Regiment 8 Kienmayer				

2 nd Division	FML Hohenfeld 	- Strength 6 331 		

1. Brigade 	GM Adler 			
Regiment 14  Ob Klebek (2 Bat.) 			
Regiment 59  Ob Jordis (2 Bat.) 			
Bat. 3 Landwehr din Mähren 			
Bat. 1 Landwehr			
Bat. 3  Leg. Erzherzog Karl Carl 			
2. Brigade GM Hofmeister 			
Regiment 60  Ob Giulay (3 Bat.) 				
Regiment 36  Ob Kollowrat (3 Bat.) 				

3 rd Division	FML Kottulinsky  -   Strength 3 661 
		
1. Brigade 	GM Spleny 			
Regiment 51  Ob Spleny (3 Bat.) 			
Regiment 31  Ob Benjowsky (2 Bat.) 			
Bat. 3 Volunteer Vienna		
Bat. 4 Volunteer Vienna			
Bat. 1 Volunteer Mähren

Reservekorps (Liechtenstein)  
Strength: 17 954 	
	
1st Grenadier-Division 	FML d'Aspré † - 	Strength 3 960 
		
1. Brigade 	GM Merville 			
Bat. Grenad.  Ob Scharlach 				
Bat. de Grenad. Scovaud 				
Bat. de Grenad. Ob Buteany 				
Bat. de Grenad  Ob Brzezinsky 				
2. Brigade	GM Hammer 			
Bat. Grenad  Ob Kirchenbetter 				
Bat. Grenad.  Ob Bissingen 				
Bat. Grenad.  Ob Oklopsia 				
Bat. Grenad.  Ob Locher 				

2nd Grenadier-Division FML Prochaska 	- Strength 5 940
 		
1. Brigade 	GM Murray 			
Bat. Grenad  Ob Frisch 				
Bat. Grenad  Ob Georgy 				
Bat. Grenad  Ob Portner 				
Bat. Grenad  Ob Leiningen 				
2.Brigade 	GM Steyrer 			
Bat. Grenad  Ob Hahn 				
Bat. Grenad  Ob Hromada 				
Bat. Grenad  Ob Legrand 				
Bat. Grenad  Ob Dumontant 				
Bat. Grenad  Ob Berger 				

1 st Cavalry- Division  FML Hessen-Homburg -  Strength 3 134 	
	
1st Brigade 	GM Roussel 			
Kürass.-Regiment 3 Albert (6 Esc.) 			
Kürass.Regiment 2 Erzherzog  Franz(6 Esc.) 			
2 nd Brigade 	GM Lederer 			
Kürass. Regiment 4 Erzherzog Ferdinand (6 Esc.) 			
Kürass.Regiment 8 Hohenzollern (6 esc.) 			
3. Brigade 	GM Kroyher 			
Kürassier Regiment 1 (4 Esc.) 			
Kürass.Regimentul 6 Liechtenstein (6 Esc.) 			

2 nd Cavalry –Division   FML Schwarzenberg  -	Strength 1 800
 		
1 st Brigade  	GM Teimern 			
Regiment 6 Chevaulegers Rosenberg (8 Esc.) 			
Dragoner-Regiment 3 Ob.Knesevitch (6 Esc.) 			
2. Brigade 	GM Kerekes 			
Husaren-Regimen ob Neutrauer (6 Esc.) 			

3 rd  Cavalry Division     FML Nostitz -	Strength 3 120 		
1 st Brigade 1 	GM Wartensleben 			
Regiment 3 Chevaulegers Ob. O'Reilly (6 Esc.) 			
Husaren Regiment 6  Ob. Blankenstein (10 Esc.) 			
2.nd Brigade 	GM Rothkirch 			
Dragoner-Regiment 1 Erzherzog Johann (6 Esc.) 			
Regiment 6 Dragon. Ob Riesch (6 Esc.)

References

Napoleonic Wars orders of battle